The New South Wales Tulloch double deck carriage stock was a class of electric multiple unit carriages operated by the New South Wales Government Railways and its successors between 1964 and 2004.

History
In February 1964, the first of 120 double deck trailers was delivered by Tulloch Limited to the New South Wales Government Railways. These were purchased to replace wooden carriage stock from Sydney's suburban fleet. The first 40 were built with power operated doors to operate with the Sputnik power cars, the remaining 80 were fitted with manually operated doors for operation with the  Suburban and Tulloch stock.

To operate with the four experimental double deck power cars, in 1968 a further two were converted for powered door operation. Further carriages were converted to power door operation in 1972/73  to operate with the Series 1 S set carriages (C3805-C3857). After the conversions were completed, T4801-T4833 formed part of the Sputnik sets, T4839-T4895 were part of the S sets and T4834-T4838 and T4896-T4920 were operated in manual door form with Suburban and Tulloch stock. At least one of the experimental power cars was converted to a trailer car.

Originally painted Tuscan red, from 1973 they were repainted in the Public Transport Commission blue and white livery before the livery was changed to Indian red in 1976. In order to create a consistency with the stainless steel carriages they operated with, T4852 and T4867 were repainted in an experimental silver livery. After a three-year lapse, T4872 was repainted flake grey and this was gradually rolled out to those carriages in S sets with the last completed in June 1993. The interiors were painted in two-tone green.

Those operating in single deck sets were withdrawn in the early 1990s, while those in S sets remained in service until March 2004. Over 15 carriages remain in existence, some of those are T4916, the only surviving manual door double deck trailer. 
This includes T4801, T4814, T4816, T4820, T4828 and T4830, which were used in power door single deck sets. Carriages used in S sets include T4840, T4844, T4857, T4864, T4874, T4881 and T4799. T4801 and T4814 are preserved by Historic Electric Traction and are operational in the consist of W3.

Preservation

References 

Double-decker EMUs
Electric multiple units of New South Wales
Train-related introductions in 1964
1500 V DC multiple units of New South Wales